Chuck Harris (born Charles William Harris) is a former American football player in the National Football League. He played for the Chicago Bears during the 1987 NFL season.

References

People from Cuba City, Wisconsin
Players of American football from Wisconsin
Chicago Bears players
Denver Dynamite (arena football) players
Los Angeles Cobras players
Washington Commandos players
Albany Firebirds players
West Virginia Mountaineers football players
1961 births
Living people
Maryland Commandos players
National Football League replacement players